is a junior college in the city of Nayoro in Hokkaido, Japan.

History 
The college opened in April 1960 for women only, but in April 1990, it became coeducational, adopting the present name at the same time.

See also 
 Nayoro City University
 List of junior colleges in Japan

External links 
  

Educational institutions established in 1960
Japanese junior colleges
1960 establishments in Japan
Universities and colleges in Hokkaido
Public universities in Japan